The Taoyuan Water Conservancy Composite Tower is a 23-storey,  skyscraper office building completed in 1997 and located in Taoyuan District, Taoyuan, Taiwan. The building serves as the Taoyuan branch of the Water Resources Agency, which will soon move to a new building in Qingpu Special District after its completion in 2021. As of April 2021, it is the fifth tallest building in the city, tied with ChungYuet Global Business Building.

See also 
 List of tallest buildings in Taiwan
 List of tallest buildings in Taoyuan City
 Water Resources Agency
 ChungYuet Global Business Building

References

1997 establishments in Taiwan
Skyscrapers in Taoyuan
Skyscraper office buildings in Taiwan
Office buildings completed in 1997